Gush Hispin (lit. Hispin Bloc) is an area in the southern Golan Heights consisting of the Israeli settlements and agricultural cooperatives of Hispin, Nov, and Avnei Eitan. The three villages are primarily religiously observant and subscribe to religious Zionism.

See also
 Israeli-occupied territories

Golan Heights